Oleg Aleksandrovich Shatov (born 29 July 1990) is a Russian professional footballer who plays as an attacking midfielder for Ural Yekaterinburg. Earlier in his career, he mostly played as a left winger or right winger.

Early life
Shatov was born and grew up in Nizhny Tagil, where the winter conditions made playing outdoor sports very difficult. As a result, Shatov began playing futsal from the age of 14, before committing fully to association football two years later.

Club career

Ural
Shatov made his professional debut in the Russian First Division in 2007 for FC Ural Sverdlovsk Oblast. He was named Ural's Player of the Year after the 2010 season.

Anzhi
Although Shatov was scouted by CSKA Moscow, he accepted an offer to join Anzhi Makhachkala during the 2011-12 winter transfer window. Upon joining Anzhi, Shatov was teammates with Roberto Carlos and Samuel Eto'o. Shatov earned his first call-up to the Russian men's national team while playing at Anzhi. At the end of Shatov's first season, the team finished in fifth place in the Russian Premier League and suffered several changes of coaches.

Zenit

Shatov was signed by Zenit Saint Petersburg in the summer of 2013. During the 2015-16 season, Shatov was a regular in Zenit's Champions League campaign that season, scoring the winning goal against Gent in the group stage. Zenit was eventually eliminated by Benfica in the final 16.

Shatov left Zenit on 29 July 2020, when his contract with the club expired.

Krasnodar
On 6 February 2018, he joined FC Krasnodar on loan until the end of the 2017–18 season.

Rubin Kazan
On 29 July 2020, he signed a contract with Rubin Kazan for a term of 2 years with an additional 1-year extension option. On 18 November 2021, his contract with Rubin was terminated by mutual consent. He explained that he decided to pause his playing career due to repeating injuries and that he will reassess his situation in January 2022.

Return to Ural
Shatov resumed playing when he rejoined his first club Ural Yekaterinburg in January 2022 for the pre-season camp. On 1 February 2022, he signed a contract with Ural until the end of the 2021–22 season. Shatov extended his contract for the 2022–23 season on 16 June 2022.

International career
After receiving a call up by coach Fabio Capello, Shatov scored a goal in his debut for Russia, in a friendly match against Iceland which Russia won 2-0.

On 2 June 2014, he was included in the Russia's 2014 FIFA World Cup squad.

Career statistics

International goals
Scores and results list Russia's goal tally first.

Honours
Anzhi
Russian Cup: 2013 Runner Up

Zenit Saint Petersburg
Russian Football Premier League: 2014–15, 2018–19, 2019–20
Russian Cup: 2016, 2019–20
Russian Super Cup: 2015, 2016

References

1990 births
People from Nizhny Tagil
Sportspeople from Sverdlovsk Oblast
Living people
Russian footballers
Russia youth international footballers
Russia under-21 international footballers
Russia international footballers
Association football midfielders
FC Ural Yekaterinburg players
FC Anzhi Makhachkala players
FC Zenit Saint Petersburg players
FC Krasnodar players
FC Rubin Kazan players
Russian First League players
Russian Premier League players
2014 FIFA World Cup players
UEFA Euro 2016 players